Ante Batarelo (born 21 November 1984 in Split) is a Croatian footballer currently who played as a midfielder for NK Lucko.

References

External links

1984 births
Living people
Footballers from Split, Croatia
Association football midfielders
Croatian footballers
NK Inter Zaprešić players
NK Hrvatski Dragovoljac players
NK Moslavina players
NK Karlovac players
NK Istra 1961 players
NK Slaven Belupo players
Balmazújvárosi FC players
Szombathelyi Haladás footballers
NK Solin players
NK Lučko players
Croatian Football League players
First Football League (Croatia) players
Nemzeti Bajnokság I players
Croatian expatriate footballers
Expatriate footballers in Hungary
Croatian expatriate sportspeople in Hungary